Nathan Allen Farwell (February 24, 1812December 9, 1893) was a politician, businessman and United States Senator from Maine.

Life and career
Born in Unity, Maine, he attended the common schools, and then taught school 1832–33. He moved to East Thomaston, Maine, in 1834 and engaged in the manufacture of lime and in shipbuilding. Farwell subsequently became a master mariner and trader. He then studied law and moved to Rockland, Maine, where he founded the Rockland Marine Insurance Co., and served as president, as well as practicing law in that city. He traveled in Europe from 1845 until 1847.

He was a member of the Maine State Senate from 1853 to 1854 and again from 1861 to 1862, serving the last year as presiding officer. He was a member of the Maine House of Representatives in 1860 and again from 1863 to 1864. He was a delegate to the Baltimore Republican National Convention in 1864, and in that year was appointed to the U.S. Senate as a Republican for the unexpired term of William Pitt Fessenden. He served in that body from October 27, 1864, to March 3, 1865, but was not a candidate for reelection in 1865. At that time he resumed his activities in the insurance business. He was delegate to the National Union Convention in Philadelphia in 1866.

Farwell died in Rockland, Maine, and is buried in Achorn Cemetery in Rockland. He was the cousin of Owen Lovejoy and Elijah P. Lovejoy.

References

Notes
 Retrieved on 2009-5-13

1812 births
1893 deaths
Presidents of the Maine Senate
Republican Party Maine state senators
Republican Party members of the Maine House of Representatives
American businesspeople in insurance
Businesspeople in insurance
People from Unity, Maine
People from Rockland, Maine
People of Maine in the American Civil War
Republican Party United States senators from Maine
Businesspeople from Maine
People from Thomaston, Maine
19th-century American politicians
19th-century American businesspeople